Andrei Olegovich Minenkov (born 6 December 1954) and Irina Valentinovna Moiseeva (born 3 July 1955) are Russian retired ice dancers who represented the Soviet Union. They were the 1976 Olympic silver medalist, 1980 Olympic bronze medalist, and two-time world champions (1975 and 1977).

Career 
Irina Moiseeva and Andrei Minenkov met at the rink when they were six years old and began skating together in 1967. They had their breakthrough during the 1974–1975 season. They were third at the Soviet Championships, behind Lyudmila Pakhomova/Aleksandr Gorshkov and Natalia Linichuk/Gennadi Karponosov, and placed just off the podium at the 1975 European Championships. However, they then went on to capture their first World title at the World Championships, in the absence of Pakhomova/Gorshkov but moving ahead of a few teams ranked higher than them earlier in the season, including Linichuk/Karpanosov.

The next season, Moiseeva and Minenkov were again ranked behind Linichuk/Karponosov at the Soviet Championships but edged past them in international competition to be second only to Pakhomova/Gorshkov. They won a silver medal at the 1976 Olympics, the first Games to include ice dancing. They also won silver at the World and European Championships. 

The 1976–1977 season was the most successful for Moiseeva and Minenkov. They won World, European and national titles. Their dominance began to wane over the following years, however, they won a total of eight consecutive World medals and seven European medals (including another gold in 1978). They also won the bronze at the 1980 Olympics. 

The couple trained at VSS Trud in Moscow. They were coached by Tatiana Tarasova, Lyudmila Pakhomova, and Natalia Dubova. Tarasova coached them for ten years, beginning in 1969. They retired in 1983 because Moiseeva was expecting their daughter.

Olympic champions Torvill and Dean considered them one of their greatest influences.

Personal life 
Moiseeva and Minenkov married in 1977 and had a daughter in 1983. In 1989, Minenkov graduated from the Moscow State Institute of Radiotechnics, Electronics and Automation and founded a company, Kholod, in 1993.

Results 
with Moiseeva

References

External links 

 Moiseyeva and Minenkov at caretoicedance.com

Navigation 

Olympic figure skaters of the Soviet Union
Figure skaters at the 1976 Winter Olympics
Figure skaters at the 1980 Winter Olympics
Olympic silver medalists for the Soviet Union
Olympic bronze medalists for the Soviet Union
Figure skaters from Moscow
Olympic medalists in figure skating
World Figure Skating Championships medalists
European Figure Skating Championships medalists
Medalists at the 1976 Winter Olympics
Medalists at the 1980 Winter Olympics